This is a list of the various vehicles and machines produced by the International Harvester company.

Cars, SUVs, vans, and pickup trucks

Cars
Auto Buggy / Auto Wagon 1907-1916

Sport-Utility Vehicles

Scout
Scout 80 (1960–1965)
80 Camper/Motorhome (only 1 known to have been produced)
Red Carpet Series
Champagne Series
Scout 800 (1965–1968)
800 Sportop
Champagne Series
Scout 800A (1969–1971)
800A Aristocrat package
800A SR-2 package
800A Sno-Star package
Scout 800B (1971)
800B Comanche package
Scout 810 (1971)
Scout II (1971–1980)
Spirit of '76 edition (1976)
Patriot special edition (1976)
Selective Edition package (1978–1979)
Scout Terra (1976–1980)
Selective Edition package (1978–1979)
Patriot special edition (1976)
Scout Traveler (1976–1980)
The Patriot special edition (1976)
Special Limited Edition RS Scout II (1980)
Scout SSII (Soft-top Safari II) (1977–1979)
Shawnee Scout package (only 3-4 produced)
Midas SSII
Scout III SSV concept vehicle (1979)
Midas Edition (1979–1980)
Manufactured by: Midas Van Conversion Co.
Family Cruiser/Cruiser
Street Machine
Off-Road Vehicle
CVI Edition (1979–1980)
Manufactured by: Custom Vehicles Incorporated (associated with Good Times, Inc.)
Midnitestar
Terrastar
Travelstar
Shadow
Raven
GMS (Green Machine Sport)
GMS (Gold Medallion Scout)
Hot Stuff
Trailstar
Sportstar

Travelall
K-Series panel truck (1940s)
Travelall L-Series panel truck (1952)
Travelall R-Series
Travelall R-Series, 2-door (1953–1957)
Travelall R-Series, 3-door (1956–1960)
Travelall R-Series, 4-door (1961–1975)
Commercial variations (modified by Springfield Equipment Company)
Travelall School Bus
Travelall Ambulance
Travelall Airport Limo

Vans

Metro Van (1938–1975)
Metro-Lite (1950s)
Metro-Mite (1950s)
Metro-Multi-Stop (1950s)
MetroAluminum-MA1200 (1971)
Similar to the GM/Chevy StepVan and GMC ValueVan
originally based on the 1937-40 D-Series trucks

Pickup trucks
Auto Wagon 1909-?
Pre-1930s, no official designation
D-1 (1933; rebadged Willys-Six C-113 with an IHC engine)
C series (1934-1936)
D series (1937-1940)
K series (mid 1940-1942 & 1946)
KB series (1947–1949)
L series (1950–1952)
R series (1953–55)
S series (1956–1957)
A series (1957-1958)
B series (1958–1961)
C series (1961–1964)
D series (1965)
1000A series (1966)
1000B series (1967)
1000C series (1968)
Light Line pickup (1969-1975)
1000D series (1969)
1000 series (1970)
1010 series (1971-1973)
100 series (1974), also 200 series
150 series (1975), production ceased April 1975.
Travelette (1969-1975)
1076 International Harvester 
Single axle tilt trailer
10' x 6' K128C3

Military vehicles

HEAVY-TRACTOR-M1-IHC-TD-18 M1 heavy tractor, International Harvester model TD18 TM 9-1777A
M10A 10K Rough Terrain Forklift, Dresser/International model M10A

M5 tractor crane, 2-Ton, light tractor, TD9
M3 tractor crane, 2-Ton, International Harvester TD14
M5 Tractor – 1942, a tracked artillery tractor
M5 half-track – 1943, an armored personnel carrier
M9A1 halftrack, see M2 Half Track Car
Dump Truck, 2½-Ton, 4X2
Truck, Cargo, 2½-Ton, 4X4 Australian No1. Mk1 (Australian Army Only) Also known as Prototype 1 (P1)
Truck, Cargo, 2½-Ton, 4X4 Australian No1. Mk2 (Australian Army Only) Also known as Prototype 2 (P2)
Truck, Cargo, 2½-Ton, 4X4 Australian No1. Mk3 (Australian Army Only) Used by Australia in Vietnam War
Truck, Cargo, 2½-Ton, 4X4 Australian No1. Mk4 (Australian Army Only)
Truck, 5-Ton, 4X2,
F1 Truck, Cargo, 5-Ton, 6X6 Australian No1.  (Australian Army Only) Used by Australia until the late 1980s
F2 Truck, Dump, 5-Ton, 6X6 Australian No1. (Australian Army Only) Used by Australia in Vietnam War
F5 Truck, Wrecker, 5-Ton, 6X6 Australian No1. (Australian Army Only) Used by Australia in Vietnam War
Truck 5-Ton, 4X2, International Harvester
M425 Tractor, COE,
M426 Tractor, COE,
29 passenger bus, 4X2, international Harvester, model K5, KS5
MXT-MV – 2006, a truck
Future Tactical Truck System – 2007, a utility vehicle
MaxxPro – 2007, an armoured fighting vehicle
APC
4000-MV
5000-MV
7000-MV

Transport trucks

United States

Model F 1915–1921, 1Ton
Model H 1915–1921, .75Ton
Model L 1915–1921, 4Ton
Model 21 1921–30, 1Ton through Model 101 5Ton
Model S 1921–1930, .75Ton through Model SF-46 2Ton
Model 33 1924–1927, 1.5Ton through Model 103 5Ton
Model 54 1927–1930, also Model 74 and Model 104
Six-Speed Special 1928–1930, 1Ton
Model A 1930-48 Models AW1 through A8, A7 is 7.5Ton
Model B 1931-? Models B2 and B3 
Cargostar 1970-1981
Eagle
Emeryville
Fleetstar (1962-1977)
Loadstar (1962–1979)
Loadstar trucks were also assembled in Doncaster (Carr Hill Works) in the mid/late 1960s
Johnny Reb (1971 - limited regional edition to the Southeastern United States)
B-Series
BC-Series
C-Series
ID-Series
L-Series (1950–1952)
R-Series (1953–1957)(R-100 - R-205)
S-Series (1955–1961)(S-100 - S-180)
Paystar (1972–2016)
5050/5070 (1972-c.1990)
5500/5600 (1990-???)
5900 (???-2016)
S-Series/4000-Series (1978–2001)
S-series (1977-early 1989)
1600/1700/1800/1900 (1978-early 1989)
2100/2200/2300 (1977-early 1989)
2500/2600 (1978-2003)
S-Series "Schoolmaster" (1978-early 1989)
1853FC (1979-1989)
4000 series (early 1989–2001)
4500/4600 (1989-1994)
4700/4800/4900 (1989-2001)
3800 (early 1989–2004)
3600 (1991-1998)
3900FC (1990-2010)
3000 (1996–present)
8000 series (1989-2001)
7100/8100/8200 (1989-2001)
8300 (1990-2001)
Transtar II
V220
VCOF
9000 Series (1971-2017)
Transtar 4200/4300 (1971-1985)
International 9000 series (1985-1999)
9370/9300 (1985-1998)
9400 (1990-1999)
9200 (1993-1999)
9100 (1997-1999)
International 9000i series (2000-2017)
9100i (2000-2002)
9200i (2000-2011)
9400i (2000-2007)
9900i (2000-c.2017)
9900ix Eagle (2000-2017)
9000 (COE) (1981-1998)
CO9670/9600 (1981-1998)
9700/9800 (1989-1998)
9800i (1998-c.2017; outside North America)

Australia
AACO (1961-1970) AACO-Australian A-line Cab Over.
ACCO (1963- now manufactured by Iveco) ACCO-Australian C-line Cab Over.

Tractors

Early models
Type A (1907–1911)
Type B
Type C Mogul (1909–1914)
Type D Titan (1910–1917)
Titan 10–20,(1915–1922)
Mogul 10–20,(1916–1919)
Mogul Junior
Mogul 8-16 (1914–1916)
McCormick-Deering 15-30/22-36 (1921–34)
McCormick-Deering 10-20 (1923–1939)
International 8-16 (1917–1922)
McCormick-Deering W-12 (1934–1938)
McCormick-Deering W-14 (1938–1939)
McCormick-Deering W-30 (1932–1940)
McCormick-Deering W-40, WD-40 (1935–1940)

Farmall F and Letter Series (1924–1954)
 F-12, Fairway 12, F-14, Fairway 14
 Regular, Fairway
 F-20
 F-30
 A, Super A, Super A1
 B, BN
 C, Super C, Super FC
 Cub, Super Cub (Super Cub was made in France only), Cub Lo-Boy
 H, HV, Super H, Super HV
 M, MV, MD, MDV, Super M, Super MV, Super MD, Super MDV Super M-TA, Super MV-TA, Super MD-TA, Super MDV-TA
 Super BM, Super BMD (These models were made in Britain, hence the 'B' designation)

Standard Series (1940–1954)
 McCormick-Deering W-4, I-4, O-4, OS-4
 McCormick-Deering W-6, WD-6
 McCormick-Deering W-9, WD-9
 McCormick Super W-4, Super I-4, Super O-4
 McCormick Super W-6, Super WD-6
 McCormick Super W-6TA, Super WD-6TA
 McCormick Super W-9, Super WD-9

Australian models
 McCormick International AW-6 (Kero, wide front)
 McCormick International Super AW-6 (Kero, wide front)
 McCormick International Super AWD-6 (Diesel, wide front)
 AM (Kero, wide front)
 Farmall Super AM (Kero, row crop)
 Farmall Super AMD (Diesel, row crop)
 Farmall AM-7 (Kero, row cop)
 Farmall AMD-7 (Diesel, row crop)
 McCormick International AW-7 (Kero, wide front)
 McCormick International AWD-7 (Diesel, wide front)
 McCormick International AOS-6 (Kero, wide front orchard tractor)
 McCormick International A514
 McCormick International A554 (Kero, wide front)
 McCormick International A554 (Diesel, wide front)
 Farmall A554 (Diesel, row crop)
 McCormick International A564 (Diesel, wide front)
 Farmall A564 (Diesel, row crop)

US Models also manufactured in Australia
 Farmall M (Kero)

UK Models also manufactured in Australia
 McCormick International A414

UK Models, grouped by upgrade (1949–1985)

Built in the Idle works at Bradford from approx 1954 to 1981? (Idle had previously built Jowett cars and vans)
 B250 With the BD144 Engine (Diesel) BC144 (Petrol)
 B275
 B276
 354
 McCormick International B414  BD154  (Diesel) BC144 (Petrol)
 McCormick International 434
 374

Models built at Doncaster between 1949 and 1985
 B450 / B450 Farmall / B450 4WD Roadless Traction Front Axle (smaller front wheels)_
 B614
B634/B634 4WD (Roadless)/ B-634 County (Equal wheel 4WD)
454(D179 3 cyl eng)/474(D206 4 cyl)/475 (Perkins eng)/574(D239 4 cyl eng)/674(D239 4 cyl eng) - all 2 wheel drive except for approx 25 built in 1977 with Kimco axle. Trans options - Torque Amplifier. Hydrostatic Drive offered on 454/574 models. First Doncaster tractors offered with factory fitted cabs. Later cab versions were isomounted to reduce noise. No heater available.
Industrial version of 454 was 2400 & 574 was 2500 (painted yellow with outboard drum handbrakes). Industrial trans option was Hydraulic Forward/Reverse or Hydro.
484(D179)/584(D206)/684(D239)/784(D239)/884(D268) - available as 2 or 4 wheel drive (Kimco front axle). Gear drive with TA option. Hydro option on some models.
Industrial versions were 248/258/268/278/288. Gear drive or Hyd Fwd/rev trans except 268 which was hydrostatic drive.
Roof option with heater made available (made by Sekura). Trans option TA. 684
Later Ag tractors were offered with "Super Deluxe Cab" made by Sekura.
485/585/685/785/885 offered with choice of XL cab or the old style cab with revamped "H pattern" gearshift. Gear drive with a Torque Amplifier as an option. 4wd option utilising ZF side drive front axle. 685 could be specified with Hydro transmission.
Industrial models kept the 248/258/268/278/288 model numbers but had "H pattern gearshift".

IH Doncaster supplied transmissions to the USA (initially Louisville) which were built into tractors with the same model designations as the Doncaster produced tractors. Also some were specifically for US only models (240/250/260/270?). Some had torque converter transmissions.
They also supplied transmissions to Kimco in Japan (joint venture IH/Komatsu) who built them into tractors and designed their own four wheel drive axle. This axle was later imported and fitted mainly to 84 series tractors by Doncaster. Designed for traction in paddy field use it proved not to be robust enough to carry the weight when front loaders were fitted.
IH Doncaster also supplied transmissions for the Volvo BM T500, 2200, 2204, 2250 and 2254 tractors.
Balers were assembled in Liverpool, but this was transferred to Carr Hill Works in Doncaster models were: B46/B47/430/440/435/445.
Carr Hill also assembled Lodestar trucks in the mid/late 1960s.
The Wheatley Hall Road factory also produced agricultural crawler tractors BTD5/BTD6/BTD8/BTD20 in red as well as yellow CE bulldozer and loader versions. Wheatley also produced backhoe loaders (3400/3500/260) and Payloaders H25/500 Payloader/H30/H50 & H65.

French models
Super FC
Farmall Super FC-N
Farmall Super FC-E
Farmall Super FC-D
Farmall F-235
Farmall F-237
Farmall F-270
Farmall F-135D
Farmall F-335D (French diesel F-350)
Farmall F-265
Farmall F-267
Farmall F-240

German models
McCormick F-12-G
McCormick FS
McCormick FG
McCormick HS
McCormick HG
McCormick FGD2
McCormick DLD2
McCormick DED3
McCormick DGD4
McCormick D-212
McCormick D-214
McCormick Farmall D-217
McCormick Standard D-217
McCormick D-320
McCormick D-436
McCormick D-440

German and French models
McCormick International 323-453
McCormick International 523-824
International 323-453
International 553-824
International 734-834
International 946-1246
International 433-833
International 554-844
International 955-1455
International 743-856 XL
International 955-1455 XL
International 956-1056 XL

Hundred series and follow-ons, grouped by upgrade (1955–1971)
In this timeframe, all Farmall models are row-crop tractors, all International models are utility tractors.  Both Farmall and International models had hi-crop (or high-clear) versions.  International models also had industrial and orchard options.

 Farmall 100
 Farmall 130
 Farmall 140
 Farmall 200
 Farmall 230
 Farmall 240
 Farmall 300, McCormick 300 (utility)
 Farmall 350, International 350 (Gas, Lp gas, Diesel)
 Farmall 460, International 460 (Gas, Lp gas, Diesel)
 Farmall 400 (Gas, Lp gas, Diesel)
 Farmall 450(Gas, Lp gas, Diesel)
 Farmall 560 (Gas, Lp gas, Diesel)
 McCormick 230 (utility)
 International 330 
 Farmall 340, International 340
 McCormick-Deering 600 (wheatland only)
 McCormick 650 (wheatland only)
 International 660 (wheatland only)
 Farmall 404, International 404
 International 414 
 International 424, 2424 Industrial
 Farmall 504, International 504, 2504 Industrial

06 series
1963–1967
 International 606
 Farmall 706
 Farmall 806
 Farmall 1206,1965

56 series 1967–1971

 International 434 Utility
 International 444 Utility, 2444 Industrial
 Farmall 544
 International 544 Utility, 2544 Industrial 
 Farmall 656
 Farmall 756
 Farmall 826 (1969)
 Farmall 856
 Farmall 1026
 Farmall 1256
 Farmall 1456 (1969)

International (1974–1985)
The Farmall brand was discontinued in 1973, all IH tractors after this date are International. IH made their 5 millionth tractor in 1974 which was a 1066.

66-series tractors

2-wheel drive tractors
1971–1976

 666 hydro made until 1973
 666
 Hydro 70 replaces the 666 hydro, 1973
 766
 966 Hydro, until 1973
 Hydro 100 replaces 966 and 1066 hydros in 1973
 1066 hydro
 1066
 1466
 1468
 1566 introduced in 1974
 1568 v8 tractor, only 862 built

All models had a blackstripe paint scheme in 1976

4-wheel drive tractors
 4166
 4366
 4568

86-series tractors

2-wheel drive tractors
1976–1981

 686
 Hydro 86
 786 introduced in 1980
 886
 986
 Hydro 186
 1086 Tri-stripe last year of production,1981
 1486 came in tri-stripe the last production year,1981
 1586 planetary gear drive

4-wheel drive tractors
 4186
 4386
 4586
 4786

2+2 tractors
generation 1
1978–1981
 3388
 3588
 3788

generation 2
1981–1985
 6388
 6588
 6788
 7088 (never released)
 7288
 7488
 7688 (never released) 
 7888 (never released)

Utility tractors

04 SERIES
 2404 INDUSTRIAL SERIES AND UTILITY SERIES MADE. IND.=NO 3 POINT (YELLOW), UTIL.=3 POINT (RED)
 2504

24 series
 2424
 2524

44 series
 2444
 2544

54 series
 354
 454
 2454
 2554

64 series
 364
 464
 664

74 series
 374
 474, 2400 Industrial
 574, 2500 Industrial
 674

84 series
 184
 284
 274 offset
 384
 484, 2400B Industrial
 584, 2500B Industrial
 684
 Hydro 84
 784
 884

End of an era

30 series
1981–1985
 3088
 3288
 3488 Hydro (only 465 made)
 3688

Optional pressurised cab all models.

50 series
1981–1985
 5088
 5288
 5488

All 50 series came standard with cab heat and air, also a variety of radio options.
FWA is also an option.

70 Series 4 Wheel Drive

1982-1984

 7388
 7588
 7788

Super 70 Series (2+2)
May 1985 to November 1985
 7088 (never released)
 7288
 7488
7688 (never released)
7888 (never released)

The Super 70 Series 2+2 line came with Command Center Cab, 50 Series partial-powershift 18 speed transmission, center drive shaft to transfer case, heavier front axle, 50 Series-style grille and decals.

Heavy Equipment

Crawler Tractors
T models gas
TD models diesel
TA-40
TK-40
TD-40
T-6
TD-6 
TD-6-61
TD-6-62
T-9
TD-7
TD-8
TD-9
TD-9-91
TD-9-92
TD-9B
TD-12
TD-14
T-14
TD-14A
TD-14-141
TD-14-142
TD-15
TD-15-150
TD-15-151
TD-15B
TD-15C
TD-18
TD-18A
TD-18-181
TD-18-182
T-20
TD-20B
TD-20C
TD-20E
TD-24
TD-25
TD-25B
TD-25C
TD-25E
TD-30
T-35
T-4
T-340
TD-340
T-5
TD-5
TDC-5
500
500-C
500-E
175
175B
L250C

Excavators
3960
3964
3984
3984 series B
630
640
650

Forklifts
International Harvester Model UB240
 U.S. Army International Harvester M10A 10K Rough Terrain Forklift
International 4500A gas forklift.

Loaders, skid steer
The following were marketed as Hustler Compact Loaders:
4120
4130
4135
4140
4150
3200A  W/VH4D WISCONSIN ENGINE 1972–1973
3200A  W/VG4D WISCONSIN ENGINE 1973- MAY 1974
3200B  W/WISCONSIN VG4D ENGINE 1974–1978
Hough 30A
Hough 30B
Hough 510
Hough 515
Hough 520
Hough 530
Hough 540
Hough 90
Hough 540
Hough 100
Hough 550
Hough 560AM
Hough 560B
Hough 570
Hough 580

Payscrapers
431 single engine open bowl
433 twin engine open bowl
442 single engine elevating
444 twin engine elevating

Payskidders
S-8
S-9

Payhauler
Payhauler

References